Liverpool Road is a former railway station on the Liverpool and Manchester Railway in Manchester, England that opened on 15 September 1830. The station was the Manchester terminus of the world's first inter-city passenger railway in which all services were hauled by timetabled steam locomotives. It is the world's oldest surviving terminal railway station. With tracks running at a second floor level behind the building, it could also be considered one of the world's first elevated railway stations.

The station closed to passenger services on 4 May 1844  when the line was extended to join the Manchester and Leeds Railway at Hunt's Bank. Liverpool Road was superseded by Manchester Victoria station for passenger services. Like its counterpart at Liverpool Crown Street the station was converted to a goods yard. Since Liverpool Road ceased operation, the oldest railway station in use is Broad Green railway station in Liverpool which opened on 15 September 1830. The Liverpool and Manchester Railway opened starting from Liverpool Crown Street, hence the older stations start from Liverpool.

The station, a Grade I listed building, is part of the Museum of Science and Industry in Manchester.

Early history 

As a consequence of opposition from the proprietors of the Mersey and Irwell Navigation, it had been intended to terminate the railway on the Salford side of the Irwell. A last minute agreement brought about a change in plan. The river would be spanned by a two arched stone bridge, incorporating a cart road for the use of the Navigation company. The real problem was how to cross Water Street. The levels would not permit an arched bridge to the dimensions demanded by the Manchester Highway Commissioners. The only alternative was a flat span across a distance judged to be too wide. William Fairbairn, in the quest to perfect fireproof mill flooring, had developed a parabolic 'T' section girder that could span such a distance. Thus, the Water Street bridge might be said to be the first modern girder bridge.

The station itself comprised a slightly curved brick viaduct that terminated in the slope that led up from Water Street to Deansgate, alongside Liverpool Road. The viaduct fronted a solid brick warehouse, a construction that owed much to canal warehouses, beyond which was a low-level yard that was excavated into the hillside. There was a wooden transit shed at the viaduct end, on the corner of Liverpool Road and Byrom Street and turnplates gave access to coal drops at the end of the yard. Of course, at that time, goods traffic was considered the most important potential source of income, and for this, the terminus was well placed in the midst of the Castlefield canal and warehousing complex.

Provision for the passengers was something of an afterthought. An existing house on the corner of Liverpool Road and Water Street was purchased for the use of the 'Station Agent'. A brick structure was erected next to it, incorporating elaborate door and window surrounds, the whole being finished in stucco rendering, scored to imitate stonework. The most curious feature was the positioning of a sundial over the first class entrance.

Passenger services 

The railway only carried first and second class passengers, and each class had its own booking hall and waiting room. As the station was some distance from the centre of Manchester, most passengers purchased a handwritten ticket from an agent at an inn or hotel. Several routes of horse omnibuses then conveyed them to the station. A clerk in the booking hall exchanged the ticket for a counterfoil, similar to a modern airline boarding pass, and made up a waybill from the ticket information for the train guard. The train guard thus had a passenger list indicating class of travel and destination, the only check against fraud.

The passengers proceeded upstairs to the waiting room, and licensed "outdoor porters" took charge of their luggage, being paid a set scale of fees. "Indoor porters" took charge of the luggage on the station platform and strapped it to the carriage roofs. The ringing of the station bell then announced that the passengers could go through the door on to the platform and board the train. The bell was also rung as a warning of departure, but the actual signal was given by the guard's trumpet or horn. The original bell is still exhibited in the station building. The planning of railway stations was clearly not so advanced at this time as supporting pillars of the building prevented certain carriage doors from opening fully.

Growth 
The station buildings were extended in 1831 by the construction of a simple two-road carriage shed on top of a range of rooms along Liverpool Road. These were intended as shops but, due to the insalubrious surroundings, were only used as offices. Beyond this range was a gate and a ramp leading to viaduct level. This was used to load and unload gentlemen's carriages, which were conveyed on flat wagons, a popular form of travel for those who could afford it.

The Grand Junction Railway, Britain's first trunk line, was completed between Curzon Street railway station in Birmingham and Warrington Bank Quay railway station, Warrington, on 4 July 1837. Through trains began to convey passengers from the station to Birmingham, and a separate booking office and waiting room were provided. From 17 September 1838 there were through carriages to London Euston by some trains after completion of the London and Birmingham Railway in that year. This increase in long-distance services resulted in one of the first private railway hotels opening in Liverpool Road. Congestion required the opening of a separate arrival station across Water Street, on the site of a former dyeworks. Further goods warehouses were erected.

Goods yard 

Passenger services ended with the opening of an extension of the L&M line from Ordsall Lane to Hunt's Bank. All passenger services were then transferred to the new Victoria Station from 4 May 1844.

Liverpool Road, which was turned into a goods yard, was developed under the ownership of the London and North Western Railway. An iron viaduct (an early girder-frame structure) was constructed to provide access to Byrom Street Warehouse; it was soon followed by the Grape Street Warehouse. The goods complex remained in operation post grouping under the London Midland and Scottish Railway from 1923 to 1948. In addition to LMS goods trains, Great Western Railway locomotives worked their goods trains to Liverpool Road from Chester via Warrington. In 1948 the site was taken over by British Railways (BR) following the nationalisation of the UK railway system.

Closure 
When the station and warehouses were abandoned in 1975 by British Rail, the Grape Street Warehouse and surroundings buildings were purchased by Granada Television. Part of it was used for the Granada Studios Tour theme attraction, and other parts were used for the set of long-running British TV soap Coronation Street.

The station building and adjacent historic railway warehouses now form part of Museum of Science and Industry in Manchester which is located in the Castlefield Urban Heritage Park.

Mainline connection
Throughout its history, Liverpool Road station had retained a working rail connection to the operational mainline, allowing heritage trains to be run directly from the Manchester to Preston Line into the museum station. However, the Ordsall Chord rail link — a Network Rail project to create a new connection between Piccadilly and Victoria stations — involved the construction of a new bridge over the River Irwell which severed the 180-year-old link to Liverpool Road station. After this project was completed, it was no longer possible to run trains into or out of Liverpool Road station. The MOSI management had initially objected to the scheme and an inquiry was set up in 2014 to investigate the potential damage to the historic structure. In May 2014, Network Rail reached an agreement with MOSI, in which the museum was to receive an undisclosed sum in compensation, and the objection was dropped. In March 2015, Patrick McLoughlin, Secretary of State for Transport, announced that the Ordsall Chord project was to go ahead with an estimated completion date of 2017. It was confirmed that the operational rail link into Liverpool Road station would be severed as a result of this project, and later in 2015 the main line connection was removed.

See also

Grade I listed buildings in Greater Manchester
Listed buildings in Manchester-M3

References

Bibliography

External links 

Disused railway stations in Manchester
Former London and North Western Railway stations
Railway stations in Great Britain opened in 1830
Railway stations in Great Britain closed in 1844
1830 establishments in England
Grade I listed buildings in Manchester
Grade I listed railway stations
Repurposed railway stations in Europe